Corydoras fulleri, formerly identified as C116/115 is a tropical freshwater fish belonging to the subfamily Corydoradinae of the family Callichthyidae native to South America where it is found in two tributaries of the río Manuripe and a tributary of the río Madre de Dios, rio Madeira basin, Peru. 

Corydoras fulleri is distinctive owing to it having two pores within its supraorbital canal, three series of teeth on the upper tooth plate of the branchial arch, and, a small fleshy flap at the corner of the mouth, ventral to the maxillary barbel.

It has a well developed and conical snout which frames a slightly concaved head shape from the tip of the snout to the anterior nares. 

It lives in a tropical climate in water with a temperature range of  It feeds on worms, benthic crustaceans, insects, and plant matter.

Etymology 
Corydoras fulleri is named in honour of Ian Fuller, an aquarist and owner of Corydoras World, a website and knowledge base dedicated to Corydoradinae Catfish.

See also 

 List of freshwater aquarium fish species

References 

Corydoras
Fish of South America
Fish of Brazil
Fish described in 2021